Robert Willis (25 January 1942 – 23 October 1999) was an English songwriter and talent manager who became the manager and eventually husband of singer Cilla Black.

Career
His first known recorded composition, "Shy of Love" was featured on the B-side of "Love of the Loved", the debut release of Cilla Black in September 1963. During the sixties he was to write many songs for his then girlfriend to record and perform.

One of his most popular – "Is It Love?" – was featured in the beat film Ferry Cross the Mersey in 1965. He collaborated with Clive Westlake, Kenny Lynch and The Beatles producer George Martin on some songs.

After the death of Black's manager, Brian Epstein, Willis took over her management duties and over the next thirty years, developed her popularity with television family audiences, and helped Black to become the highest-paid female presenter on television.

Death
On 23 October 1999, aged 57, Willis died of lung and liver cancer at the Royal Free Hospital in London. His funeral service was held on 1 November at Saint Mary the Virgin Church in Denham, Buckinghamshire. He was cremated.

Personal life
Willis had four brothers named Albert, Ronnie, Bertie and Kenneth.

Willis married Cilla Black on 25 January 1969, his 27th birthday, at Marylebone Town Hall. To please her Catholic family, the couple were granted a dispensation to have their marriage blessed on 6 March 1969 at St Mary's Church in Liverpool's Woolton suburb. (Willis was from an Anglican background.) They had three sons together: Robert (born 1970), Ben (born 1974), and Jack (born 1980). Their daughter Ellen (born 1975) lived for only two hours.

Discography

As songwriter

Singles
"Shy of Love"  (A-side "Love of the Loved")  UK#35  Sept. 1963
"Just for You"  (A-side "Anyone Who Had a Heart")  UK#1  Jan. 1964
"Suffer Now I Must"  (A-side "You're My World")  UK#1  May 1964
"He Won't Ask Me"  (A-side "It's for You")  UK#7  July 1964
"Is It Love?"  (A-side "You've Lost That Lovin' Feelin'")  UK#2  Jan. 1965
"I Don't Want to Know"  (A-side "I've Been Wrong Before")  UK#17  Apr. 1965
"Night Time Is Here"  (A-side "Alfie")  UK#9  Mar. 1966
"From Now On" (Bobby Willis/Clive Westlake)  (A-side "I Only Live to Love You")  UK#26  Nov. 1967
"I Couldn't Take My Eyes Off You" (Bobby Willis/Clive Westlake)  (A-side "Step Inside Love")  UK#8  Mar. 1968
"London Bridge" (Bobby Willis/Clive Westlake)  (A-side "Surround Yourself with Sorrow")  UK#3  Feb. 1969
"That's Why I Love You" (Bobby Willis/Kenny Lynch)  (A-side "Child of Mine")   Dec. 1970

Album tracks
"Come to Me" (George Martin/Bobby Willis)  Cilla  Jan. 1965
"Our Brand New World" (Bobby Willis/Clive Westlake)  Images  May 1971

References

Cilla Black
English songwriters
English music managers
20th-century English musicians
People from Woolton
1942 births
1999 deaths
Deaths from liver cancer
Deaths from lung cancer in England
Musicians from Liverpool
20th-century English businesspeople